Siderúrgica del Turbio S.A. (Sidetur) was a subsidiary of Siderúrgica de Venezuela S.A. (Sivensa), the biggest - wholly private - Venezuelan steel corporation. Their main products are rebars, bars, beams, angles and flats. Sidetur develops their exporting activity in more than 25 countries in the markets of America, Africa, Asia and Europe. Their seven operating plants are located in the states of Bolívar, Carabobo, Miranda, Lara and the Capital District. Additionally, Sidetur has 14 ferrous material collection centers located in various cities.

Founded in 1948 in Antímano, Caracas, Sidetur now has six plants, all in Venezuela.

In 1998, Sivensa suffered a strong crisis - mainly due to the Asian Crisis - which reduced the size of the company and generated a big debt. Thanks to high steel prices, the situation of the company is improving with the years. Nowadays, the company has a capacity of annual production of 835,000 tons of steelmaking, 615,000 tons of rolling and 67,000 of electric welding.

In 2010 Sidetur´s assets were expropriated by the Chavez Government. As of May 21, 2013  no compensation was paid to former owners.

Plants
All six of Sidetur's plants are located in Venezuela. Only two of them, Planta Barquisimeto and Planta Casima, are designed to melt steel into billets.

Sidetur ferrous material collection centers are located nationwide in Venezuela. The company serves the following cities and their neighboring areas:

 Caracas
 Guarenas
 Santa Lucía
 Valencia
 Cagua
 Barquisimeto
 Maracaibo
 Ciudad Ojeda
 El Vigía
 Barcelona
 Maturín
 El Tigre
 Puerto Ordaz
 Porlamar

Production
The following table shows the production capacities of the different plants that Sidetur owns in metric tons per year.

See also
List of Companies of Venezuela
Siderúrgica de Venezuela S.A. (Sivensa)
Steel

References

External links
 Official Website

Steel companies of Venezuela